Birendra Prasad Baishya is an Asom Gana Parishad politician from Assam. He was elected in Lok Sabha election in 1996 from Mangaldoi constituency and union minister of Steel and Mines. He was elected to Rajya Sabha in 2008 to 2014 and again in June 2019.

Baishya is also President of Indian Weightlifting Federation.

References 

Living people
Asom Gana Parishad politicians
Members of the Assam Legislative Assembly
People from Baksa district
1956 births
Mining ministers of India
Steel_Ministers of India
Members of the Cabinet of India
India MPs 1996–1997
Politicians from Guwahati
Lok Sabha members from Assam
Rajya Sabha members from Assam
Indian sports executives and administrators